Sormovsky (masculine), Sormovskaya (feminine), or Sormovskoye (neuter) is an adjective form of Sormovo, a neighborhood within the Russian city of Nizhny Novgorod. They may refer to:
Sormovsky City District, a city district of Nizhny Novgorod, Russia 
Sormovskaya Line, a line of the Nizhny Novgorod Metro that will one day reach Sormovo.

See also
 Sormovo (disambiguation)